Khakassia (Xakasiya, Xakas Çirë), officially the Republic of Khakassia, is a republic of Russia located in southern Siberia. Its capital and largest city is Abakan. As of the 2010 Census, the republic's population was 532,403.

Geography 
The republic is located in the southwestern part of Eastern Siberia and borders Krasnoyarsk Krai in the north and east, the Tuva Republic in the southeast and south, the Altai Republic in the south and southwest, and Kemerovo Oblast in the west and northwest. Mountains (eastern slopes of Kuznetsk Alatau and the Abakan Range) cover two-thirds of the republic's territory and serve as the natural boundaries of the republic. The highest point is Kyzlasov Peak. The remaining territory is flat, with the Minusinsk Hollow being the most prominent feature. The Yenisei is the largest river in the republic. Other significant rivers include the Abakan, Tom’, Bely Iyus, Black Iyus, and the Chulym (between the Yenisei and the eastern mountains), with all except the Abakan part of the Ob river basin. There are over three hundred lakes in the republic, both salt- and fresh-water. Natural resources are abundant and include iron, gold, silver, coal, oil, and natural gas. Molybdenum deposits are the largest in Russia. Forests cover the south and the west of the republic.

History 

The territory of modern Khakassia formed the core of the Yenisei Kirghiz state from the 6th century CE. In the 13th century, following defeat by the Mongols, the majority of the Kyrgyz people migrated southwest to Central Asia to the area of present-day Kyrgyzstan. Modern Khakas people regard themselves as the descendants of those Kyrgyz who remained in Siberia. Khakassia was incorporated into the Russian state under Peter the Great.
This incorporation was confirmed in a treaty - the  - between Russia and China in 1729. As it was common to deport convicted criminals from European Russia to Siberia, forts were quickly constructed in Khakassia (1707 and 1718). Many prisoners remained even after release. Many of the indigenous Khakas people converted to the Russian Orthodox faith and gradually abandoned their nomadic way of life.

By the time of the 1917 Russian Revolution, Russians made up approximately half of the population. Under Soviet rule, autonomy was granted on 20 October 1930, when the Khakas Autonomous Oblast was established. The borders of the autonomous oblast are the same as the borders of the modern Khakas Republic.

During the 1920s and 1930s, the Soviet authorities resettled an estimated quarter of a million Russians in the region. These were followed by 10,000 Volga Germans deported during World War II. By the time of the 1959 Census, ethnic Khakas people represented little more than 10% of the population of the Khakas oblast.

Until 1991, the Khakas Autonomous Oblast was administratively subordinated to Krasnoyarsk Krai. In July 1991, it was elevated in status to that of a Soviet socialist republic within the Russian Federation, and in February 1992 it became the Republic of Khakassia.

Administrative divisions

Demographics 
Population:

Vital statistics 
 Source: Russian Federal State Statistics Service

In 2007, the republic recorded a positive natural increase of population for the first time in many years (Although very small, less than +0.01% per year), being one of the 20 Russian regions to have a positive natural population growth rate.

Ethnic groups 
According to the 2021 Russian Census, ethnic Russians make up 82.1% of the republic's population, while the ethnic Khakas are only 12.7%. Other groups include ethnic Germans (0.7%), Tuvans (0.5%), Ukrainians (0.4%), and a host of smaller groups, each accounting for less than 0.5% of the total population.

Religion 

According to a 2012 survey, 31.6% of the population of Khakassia adheres to the Russian Orthodox Church, 6% are unaffiliated Christians, 1% are Orthodox Christian believers without belonging to any church or are members of other (non-Russian) Orthodox churches. 2% of the population adheres to Slavic native faith (Rodnovery) or Khakas Tengrism and folk religion, 1% to Islam, 1% to forms of Protestantism, 0.4% to forms of Hinduism (Vedism, Krishnaism or Tantrism) and another 0.4% to Tibetan Buddhism. In addition, 38% of the population declares to be "spiritual but not religious", 16% is atheist, and 2.6% follows other religions or did not give an answer to the question.

Economy 
The main industries in the republic are coal mining, ore mining, and timber.

Transport 

The road network is most developed around the major cities of the centre, west, and southwest.
Federal highway R-257 runs through Khakassia. Other major highways include the regional highway A161 south from R-257 in Abakan along the Abakan valley to Abaza and across the mountains to Ak-Dovurak (Tuva). The most developed sections of roads are Abakan - Sayanogorsk, Abakan - Beya, Abakan - Abaza, Abakan - Sorsk, Bograd - Shira - Kopyevo, and Kopyevo - Priiskovy.
Roads to other smaller settlements are mainly dirt roads, although they are currently being replaced with a hard surface.

663 km of railways, electrified from Abakan to Kaltas. Other non-electrified sections are Tigey - Kopievo, Askiz - Abaza, Biskamzha - Toya.

The section of the Tigey-Kopyёvo railway and further to Uzhur, Achinsk connects two railway arteries: the Trans-Siberian Railway and Yuzhsib (South-Siberian: Taishet - Abakan - Novokuznetsk - Artyshta - Barnaul - Kulunda - Pavlodar - Astana - Tobol - Kartaly - Magnitogorsk). In addition to Abakan, the central station is Biskamzha. The city of Sayanogorsk is connected to the railway network through the station Kamyshta.

Airports: Abakan International Airport has regular flights to Moscow, Norilsk, Novosibirsk, Tomsk, and Krasnoyarsk.

Sports 
Sayany-Khakassia has been playing in the highest division of Russian bandy, the Russian Bandy Super League, for a long time, but was relegated after the 2012–13 season. Now they play in the 2nd highest division.

Views of Khakassia

See also 

 List of Chairmen of the Supreme Council of Khakassia
 Music in Khakassia
 Altai-Sayan region

Notes

References

Sources 
 
 
 

 
Central Asia
Russian-speaking countries and territories
States and territories established in 1991
Observer members of the International Organization of Turkic Culture